Song Kai (born 29 January 1984) is a male Chinese rower, who competed for Team China at the 2008 Summer Olympics.

References

1984 births
Living people
Chinese male rowers
Olympic rowers of China
Rowers at the 2008 Summer Olympics